City Hose Company No. 9, also known as City Fire Station No. 9 , is a historic fire station located at St. Joseph, Missouri.  It was designed by the architect Edmond Jacques Eckel (1845–1934) and built in 1901.  It is a picturesque two-story, brick building and features a decorative oriel window.

It was listed on the National Register of Historic Places in 1985.

References

Fire stations on the National Register of Historic Places in Missouri
Government buildings completed in 1901
Buildings and structures in St. Joseph, Missouri
National Register of Historic Places in Buchanan County, Missouri